Walter Slezak (3 May 1902 – 21 April 1983) was an Austrian-born film and stage actor active between 1922 and 1976. He mainly appeared in German films before migrating to the United States in 1930 and performing in numerous Hollywood productions.

Slezak typically portrayed wily and loquacious characters, often philosophical, and often with a taste for food, drink, and fine living. He played a crafty villain as a U-boat captain in Alfred Hitchcock's film Lifeboat (1944), a charming, two-timing major domo to a tycoon in Come September (1961), and a wandering gypsy in The Inspector General (1949).  He stood out as shrewd, unscrupulous private investigators in film noir, as in Cornered (1945) and Born to Kill (1947).

Early life
Slezak was born in Vienna, the son of opera tenor Leo Slezak and Elisabeth "Elsa" Wertheim.  He studied medicine for a time and later worked as a bank teller. His older sister Margarete Slezak was also an actress.

Career
Slezak was talked into taking his first role, in the 1922 Austrian film Sodom und Gomorrah, by his friend and the film's director, Michael Curtiz.

In his youth (while still slim) Slezak was cast as a leading man in silent films. He also acted on the stage for many years, debuting on Broadway in 1931.

His first American film was Once Upon a Honeymoon (1942), with Ginger Rogers and Cary Grant. He worked steadily and appeared in over 100 films including The Princess and the Pirate (1944), The Spanish Main (1945), Sinbad the Sailor (1947), Born to Kill (1947), Abbott and Costello in the Foreign Legion (1950), People Will Talk (1951),  and Call Me Madam (1953). 

Slezak played the lead in Broadway musicals, including Fanny, for which he won the Tony Award for Best Actor in a Musical.

Slezak acted in radio in such shows as Lux Radio Theater, Columbia Workshop, The Pepsodent Show, and The Charlie McCarthy Show. He made numerous television appearances, including in the programs The Loretta Young Show, This Is Show Business, Playhouse 90, and Studio One, and appeared as The Clock King in episodes 45 and 46 of TV series Batman (1966). 

In 1959/60, Slezak appeared at the Metropolitan Opera in Johann Strauss's operetta Der Zigeunerbaron. In the 1970s, Slezak played the non-singing role of Frosch, the jailer, in the San Francisco Opera production of Johann Strauss's operetta Die Fledermaus. Later film roles in Britain included the Cliff Richard vehicle Wonderful Life (1964) and Black Beauty (1971).

Personal life
Slezak married Johanna "Kaasi" Van Rijn on 10 October 1943. The couple had three children: Ingrid, Erika, and Leo. Erika went on to become an Emmy-winning actress, and starred as Victoria Lord on the long-running soap opera One Life to Live from 1971 to its cancellation in 2012. In 1974, Slezak appeared on the series as her character's godfather, Lazlo Braedecker.

Slezak was close friends in Vienna in the 1930s with heiress Maria Altmann and her family.

Death
On 21 April 1983, Slezak died from a self-inflicted gunshot. He was reportedly despondent over the state of his health, most notably heart trouble, a recent prostate operation, and a shoulder injury requiring several treatments a week. He was buried in the grave of his parents in the cemetery of St. Laurentius Church, a Catholic parish in Egern, Bavaria.

Autobiography
Slezak's autobiography, What Time's the Next Swan? was published in 1962. The book's title refers to an alleged incident in the career of his father, heldentenor Leo Slezak. During a performance in the title role of Lohengrin, the elder Slezak was supposed to finish his aria by stepping into a swan boat and then being pulled offstage. When a stagehand removed the boat prematurely, Slezak supposedly reacted to the error by asking the audience "What time's the next swan?"

Awards
In 1955, Slezak won a Tony Award for his role in the Broadway production of Fanny.

Complete filmography

References

External links

 
 
 
 
 Walter Slezak papers, 1905-1983, held by the Billy Rose Theatre Division, New York Public Library for the Performing Arts
 Photographs and literature

1902 births
1983 deaths
20th-century Austrian male actors
20th-century Austrian male singers
Austrian emigrants to the United States
Austrian male film actors
Austrian male silent film actors
Tony Award winners
Austrian male musical theatre actors
Austrian male television actors
Male actors from Vienna
RCA Victor artists
Suicides by firearm in New York (state)
1983 suicides
Austrian people of Czech descent
American people of Moravian descent
American people of Czech descent